Novi Marof is a town in north-western Croatia, located south of Varaždin and east of Ivanec, in Varaždin County. It lies on intersection of state roads D3  (from south to north) and D24 (from west) and is also connected with highway A4, state road D22 (from east) and R201 railway.

History
In the late 19th and early 20th century, Novi Marof was a district capital in Varaždin County of the Kingdom of Croatia-Slavonia.

Population
The population of the municipality is 13,246 (census 2011), distributed in the following settlements:

 Bela, population 62
 Donje Makojišće, population 526
 Filipići, population 122
 Gornje Makojišće, population 400
 Grana, population 526
 Jelenščak, population 213
 Kamena Gorica, population 232
 Ključ, population 928
 Krč, population 418
 Madžarevo, population 910
 Možđenec, population 677
 Novi Marof, population 1,956
 Orehovec, population 297
 Oštrice, population 452
 Paka, population 81
 Podevčevo, population 737
 Podrute, population 421
 Presečno, population 893
 Remetinec, population 1,477
 Strmec Remetinečki, population 511
 Sudovec, population 350
 Topličica, population 207
 Završje Podbelsko, population 850

Notable residents
 Blaženko Lacković, Croatian handball player

Culture
The town was a home of the Croatian independent record label Ill In The Head until it relocated to Canada.
The town has memorial markers to:
 Croatian soldiers and civilians who died or went missing during and after World War II
 1992 European Community Monitor Mission helicopter downing during the Croatian War of Independence

References

External links

 Novi Marof official site 
 Novi Marof unofficial Web portal 

Cities and towns in Croatia
Populated places in Varaždin County
Varaždin County (former)